Wajdi Essid is a Tunisian football manager. He is currently manager of Al-Wahda in the Saudi Professional League.

References

Living people
1960 births
Tunisian football managers
Tunisian expatriate football managers
Abha Club managers
Al-Shamal SC managers
Al-Wehda Club (Mecca) managers
MC El Eulma managers
Qatar Stars League managers
Saudi Professional League managers
Tunisian expatriate sportspeople in Qatar
Tunisian expatriate sportspeople in Saudi Arabia
Expatriate football managers in Qatar
Expatriate football managers in Saudi Arabia